Nurham Osbie Warwick (March 5, 1940 – October 21, 2020) was a politician in the American state of North Carolina. He served in the North Carolina House of Representatives from 1996 to 2002. He was a retired farmer and educator.

A native of Clinton, North Carolina, he was an alumnus of North Carolina State University. He also did graduate work at University of North Carolina at Chapel Hill and Pennsylvania State University. Warwick died at his home in Clinton, North Carolina on October 21, 2020.

References

External links

Democratic Party members of the North Carolina House of Representatives
People from Clinton, North Carolina
North Carolina State University alumni
University of North Carolina at Chapel Hill alumni
Pennsylvania State University alumni
1940 births
2020 deaths
21st-century American politicians